Loftmynd ("Aerial") was an album released in August 1987 by Icelandic rock singer Megas. Formed of 17 tracks, this album was released through Gramm and featured singer Björk and her sister Inga Guðmundsdóttir as background vocalists. Loftmynd also includes Megas’ long-time collaborator Guðlaugur Kristinn Óttarsson who added guitars.

Track listing

External links
Page about Megas at Tónlist.com - It features discography with mp3 samples.
Official site of Guðlaugur Kristinn Óttarsson
Page of G. K. Óttarsson at MySpace.com
Page of Þorsteinn Magnússon at MySpace.com

1987 albums
Megas albums